Josquin Des Pres (born Josquin Turenne Des Pres) is a 20th-century French-born American record producer, songwriter and TV composer who is also known as a collaborative writer with English lyricist, poet, and singer Bernie Taupin on several compositions. Josquin Des Pres also writes musical scores and music trailers for more than 40 major TV networks and television shows including The Ellen DeGeneres Show, The Bachelor (U.S. TV series), American Idol, The Tyra Banks Show, George Lopez (TV series), Anderson Cooper, TMZ on TV, Extra (TV program), American Chopper, Pawn Stars, Deadliest Catch, CNN, NBC, HGTV, TBS (U.S. TV channel), Bravo (U.S. TV network), Food Network, Animal Planet, Discovery Channel, History (U.S. TV channel), Travel Channel, CBS Television Stations, Viacom, VH1, ABC, BET, KPBS (TV), TLC (TV network), and The CW Network. His works are also known on MTV Networks Television Series Catfish, The Seven, When I Was Seventeen, MTV Cribs, Pimp My Ride, Teen Mom, True Life and 10 on Top. Josquin Des Pres has also contributed to music media books for Hal Leonard Corporation and Mel Bay instructional music books. Josquin has written a vast library of compositions and music techniques on bass, music studies and various collections which are used by music teachers, private studies and in schools both nationally and internationally as a standard tool in the music industry.

Early life
Josquin started out in the mid 70s playing bass professionally in the South of France. Josquin joined Prog-Rock group Edition Speciale with whom he recorded two albums which include Allée Des Tilleuls for United Artists Records and Aliquante RCA Records from 1975-1977. In the late 70s Josquin toured with French Jazz violinist Didier Lockwood and then migrated to Los Angeles, California to play with former Mahavishnu Orchestra violinist Jerry Goodman. In the early 80s Josquin formed the melodic hard rock group Stress (pop rock band) with guitarist/vocalist Mike Thomas who were later joined by former Aerosmith guitarist Jimmy Crespo.

In the late 1980s,  Taupin and Des Pres wrote several songs covered by various artists around the globe.

Josquin Des Pres' father is the Haitian artist François Turenne des Pres.

Music producer and bass player

Over the last 4 decades, Josquin des Pres has worked with Songwriter/Lyricist Bernie Taupin,  Singer/Songwriter Jason Mraz, Flamenco band Gipsy Kings, Jack Johnson (musician), Jax (singer), Actress/Singer Laura Marano, French Singer/Songwriter Joyce Jonathan, drummers Jeff Porcaro, Vinnie Colaiuta, Marco Minnemann, Alex Acuña, Tower of Power drummer David Garibaldi (musician), Little Feat drummer Richie Hayward, guitarists Steve Lukather, Jerry Donahue, John Jorgenson, Fred Tackett, Don Preston and Pat Benatar guitarist and co-writer Scott St. Clair Sheets, bassists Bunny Brunel, Stanley Clarke, Billy Sheehan, country singer-songwriter Charley Pride. He also produced and co-wrote "The Gypsy Swing AllStars" album featuring John Jorgensen and Charlie Bisharat.   Jamie Reno's Album featuring Peter Frampton, Dickey Betts, Skunk Baxter, Charlie Daniels, Ricky Skaggs and Randy Meisner. Josquin is also the owner and Record producer of Track Star Studios in La Mesa, California.

Josquin Des Pres songs written with Bernie Taupin

In the late 1980s, Bernie Taupin and Josquin Des Pres wrote several songs that have been recorded and performed by various artists around the globe. Bernie_Taupin#Collaboration_with_other_artists

Black on Blue
Destiny
Dollhouse
Heart of Glass
In the Names of Dark Angels
Radiate
Red Neck Male
So Much Love
The Backstairs
The Last to Know
Turn Back the Hands of Time
Waitress in a Roadhouse
You Freed Me

Discography
Complete Discography available at http://www.allmusic.com/artist/josquin-des-pres-mn0000287123

"Jason Mraz/Joyce Jonathan" A La Vie Comme A La Mort  2100 Records JoNa Music Group 2021
"Reneé Dominique" (feat. Jason Mraz)" Could I Love You Any More Virgin Records / Universal   2019
"Bunny Brunel / Stanley Clarke"  Bass Ball NIkaia Records   2018
"Mario Olivares"  Radio Nostalgia 2  Mario Olivares Music   2014
"Cindy Lee Berryhill"  Music is Love Route 61 Music   2013
"Jacqueline Grace Lopez"  This Chrismas  J Glo Records   2012
"Gypsy Swing AllStars" feat. John Jorgensen  Allegro Media Group   2010
"21AD"   Christmas, A Winter's Love  Allegro Media Group   2010
"Mario Olivares"    Radio Nostalgia  Mario Olivares Music   2009
"Jacqueline Grace Lopez"  A Global Soul  J Glo Records    2009
"Danny Riley / Jack Johnson"  Hallelujah  Indie Release  2008
"Danny Riley / Jack Johnson"	 Conversation  Indie Release  2007
"Deirdre Hughes"  Deirdre Hughes  Satchel Catch Records   2007
"Joey Pearson"  Authentic  Track Star Entertainment   2006
"Gipsy Kings"    Mira La Chica   Sony Music   2006
"Jamie Reno"  Greatest Hits  33rd Street Records  2004
"Joey Pearson"  Mirror Image  Track Star Entertainment  2004
"Jamie Reno"  All American Music 33 Street Records   2004
"Deadbolt"  Hobo Babylon  Cargo Music  2002
"Deadbolt"    Zulu Death Mask     Cargo Music  2002
"Jack Johnson"    Latitude 32     Live 94.9  2001
"The Young Dubliners"      Red    Higher Octave Music   2000
"Lisa Sanders"  Life Takes You Flying   Earth Music/Cargo Music, Inc.   1999
"Deadbolt"       Voodoo Trucker      Cargo Music    1999
"Mary Dolan"          Another Holy Day    Earth Music/Cargo Music, Inc.    1998
"The Young Dubliners"    Alive, Alive'O    Earth Music/Cargo Music, Inc.    1998
"Basses Influences"    Volume 2    XIII BIS Records    1998
"Tristan Des Pres"   World Affair   Muffin Records   1997
"Scott Sheets"     St. Clair    MTM Music   1997
"Lisa Sanders"    Isn't Life Fine   Cargo Music / MCA Records    1997
"Conglomerate"    Armaghetto  Earth Music/Cargo Music, Inc.   1995
"Steve Harris"   Pebble   Earth Music/Cargo Music, Inc.   1995
"Yves Choir"   By Prescription Only   Musidisc   1989
"Jimmy Martin"   The Rhythm of Life   Musidisc   1989
"Fisc"    Handle With Care    Musidisc   1988
 "Michel Polnareff" Incognito RCA 1985
 "Michel Polnareff" Viens Te Faire Chahuter RCA 1985
"Stress"    Killing Me Night and Day    Musidisc / Deep Shag Records    1985
"Stress"    Search For The Fool    Musidisc / Deep Shag Records    1985   
"Jean Michel Kajdan"    First Step   Polydor    1979  
"Edition Speciale" Allée Des Tilleuls  RCA  1977  
"Edition Speciale" Aliquante     United Artists   1976

Music instructional works
Josquin Des Pres has written, co-written and scored at least 18 books, audio CD's and DVD's regarding the music industry, music tutorials and bass playing.  His books are a standard in music instruction worldwide.

Creative Careers in Music:

Reality Check: Hal Leonard Publishing 

Bass Fitness: Hal Leonard Publishing

Guitar Fitness: Hal Leonard Publishing

Slap Bass Essentials: Hal Leonard Publishing

Muted Grooves For Bass: Hal Leonard Publishing

Simplified Sight Reading For Bass: Hal Leonard Publishing

Fretless Bass: Hal Leonard Publishing 

Hip Hop Bass: Hal Leonard Publishing

70's Funk and Disco Bass: Hal Leonard Publishing

First Bass: Hal Leonard Publishing

J.S. Bach For Bass: Mel Bay Publications

Classical Masterpieces For Bass: Mel Bay Publications

Daily Chop Builders For Bass: Mel Bay Publications

Encyclopedia of Bass Riffs: Mel Bay Publications

The New Sound of Funk Bass: Mel Bay Publications

Essential Reading Skills For Guitar: Alfred Music

Classic Funk and R&B Bass:

Television

Josquin Des Pres has written music and themes for the following TV Shows and TV Networks:
Ellen de Generes, The Bachelor, American Idol, Tyra Banks, George Lopez Show, Anderson Cooper, TMZ, Extra, American Chopper, Pawn Stars, Deadliest Catch, The Today Show, World's Strongest Man, American Heroes, Shahs of Sunset, Ladies of London, Teen Titans, Impractical Jokers etc. MTV Networks (Catfish, The Seven, When I Was Seventeen, Cribs, Pimp My Ride, Teen Mom, True Life, 10 on Top etc.) CNN, NBC, HGTV, TBS, Bravo, Food Network, Animal Planet, Discovery Channel, History Channel, Travel Channel, CBS, Viacom, VH1, ABC, BET, KPBS, TLC, CW Network, Miss Universe etc.

Associated record labels

United Artists Records
RCA records
Cargo Records
MCA Records
Musea Records
EMI Publishing
Virgin Records
Universal Music Group
My Major Company
Warner Chappell Publishing
Warner Brothers Television
Riptide Music Group

References

External links
http://www.berniejtaupin.com/taupin_lyrics_other-artists-90s.html
https://www.halleonard.com/search/search.action?_c&subsiteid=1&keywords=josquin+des+pres&x=0&y=0
http://www.melbay.com/AdvancedSearch/Default.aspx?SearchTerm=josquin+des+pres
http://allworth.com/author?author=9557-des-pres-josquin

1954 births
Living people
French emigrants to the United States
21st-century American composers